Reginald Wayne (born November 17, 1978) is an American former professional football player who was a wide receiver for 14 seasons with the Indianapolis Colts of the National Football League (NFL). He played college football at the University of Miami, and was drafted by the Colts in the first round (30th overall) of the 2001 NFL Draft. A six-time Pro Bowl selection, Wayne was a member of the Colts' Super Bowl XLI championship team that beat the Chicago Bears. He ranks tenth all-time in NFL career receptions, tenth all-time in NFL receiving yards, and 24th all-time in career touchdown receptions. On December 14, 2014, Wayne played in both his 209th game and his 142nd win as a member of the Colts, breaking the franchise records set by Peyton Manning.

Early life
Wayne is the youngest of three sons. His father, Ralph, is a former linebacker for Grambling State. A New Orleans Saints fan in his youth, he was more interested in baseball growing up but chose football by the time he attended John Ehret High School.

College career
Wayne attended the University of Miami, where he was a four-year starter for the Hurricanes. He set a school record of 173 career catches (including 36 consecutive games with a reception) and is one of only five wide receivers in school history to post 20 or more touchdowns in his career, along with Michael Irvin, Lamar Thomas, Leonard Hankerson, and Andre Johnson. Wayne's 48 receptions during the 1997 season set a school record for freshmen, which still stands today. Wayne also ran track and field at the University of Miami, where he recorded a personal best of 21.87 seconds in the 200 meters. Wayne graduated with a degree in liberal arts; his roommate was future Baltimore Ravens safety Ed Reed. Wayne was also teammates with future Indianapolis Colts teammate Edgerrin James while at 'The U'.

College statistics

Wayne was inducted into the University of Miami Sports Hall of Fame at their 43rd Annual Induction Banquet held on March 24, 2011.

Professional career

Indianapolis Colts

Wayne was selected by the Indianapolis Colts as the 30th selection in the 2001 NFL Draft, the sixth of 34 wide receivers taken in a draft class that included eight future pro-bowlers at the position. He was expected to eventually complement the Colts' other star receiver, Marvin Harrison. He played all 211 games of his career for the Colts.

2001 season
In Wayne's first year, he caught 27 passes for 345 yards with no touchdowns. He only made nine starts and missed three games altogether due to a high ankle sprain.

2002 season
His yards doubled the next year as he caught 49 passes for 716 yards and four touchdowns. He had at least one reception in 14 of the team's 16 games, and more than 100 yards receiving in three of them.

2003 season
Wayne broke into the starting lineup in the 2003 season, and he caught 68 balls for 838 yards and seven touchdowns. This included two different games with 141 yards receiving.

2004 season
In 2004, Wayne caught 77 passes for 1,210 yards and 12 touchdowns during a season in which Colts quarterback Peyton Manning threw a then-record 49 touchdowns. He had four 100+ yard games, including personal-bests 184 yards on 11 receptions in Week 3 against Green Bay. During the playoffs, Wayne was named the "Wild Card Weekend Offensive Player of the Week" after the Colts beat the Broncos. Wayne had 10 receptions for 221 yards and two touchdowns in the game, then the second-most receiving yards in a wild card game.

2005 season
In 2005, Wayne again had 1,000+ yards receiving, and increased his reception total to 83. In Week 17, the 13-2 Colts rested most of their top players in preparation for the playoffs, and Wayne had zero receptions for the last time in his remaining 134 regular season games. In the playoffs, Wayne had 97 yards, a two-point conversion, and a critical 22-yard reception to set up a potential game-tying field goal in a 21-18 loss to the eventual champion Pittsburgh Steelers.

2006 season
In 2006, Wayne signed a 6-year, $39.5 million contract. He broke the 100-yard mark five times, including a season-best 134 yards and three touchdowns in Week 8 against Denver. He went on to catch 86 balls for a then-career-high 1,310 yards and 9 touchdowns. As a result, Wayne was selected to his first Pro Bowl. In the postseason, Wayne had five receptions in each of the first three games, then helped the Colts defeat the Chicago Bears in Super Bowl XLI with a 53-yard touchdown reception in the first quarter.

2007 season
In 2007, Wayne responded to a rash of injuries on the team, including Harrison and tight end Dallas Clark, by setting a then-career-high in receptions (104), and a career-high in yards (1,510). This included six games with over 100 yards receiving, and a season-best 168 yards with a touchdown in Week 8 against Carolina. He led the league in receiving yards and was selected to go to the Pro Bowl for the second consecutive year.

2008 season
In 2008, Wayne posted a Pro Bowl season for the third consecutive year with 82 catches for 1,145 yards and six touchdowns. This included four 100+ yard games, four touchdowns in the first five games, and a 65-yard score on the opening drive of Week 10 against the Pittsburgh Steelers. In the Wild Card round, he had 129 yards including a 72-yard touchdown, but the Colts lost in overtime, eliminated in the first round by the San Diego Chargers for the second consecutive year.

2009 season
In Week 10 of 2009, Wayne caught the winning touchdown pass with 0:14 left against the New England Patriots in what is now known as the "4th and 2" game. Wayne was also selected as a starter for the Pro Bowl, but couldn't play due to the Colts playing in the Super Bowl. In Super Bowl XLIV, Wayne had 5 catches for 46 yards, but the Colts lost to the New Orleans Saints 31-17.

2010 season

In 2010, Wayne was second in the NFL receptions with 111 (a career-high), and third in receiving yards with 1,355. During a season where the Colts heavily relied on Peyton Manning to win games, Wayne again cemented himself as one of the top receivers in the NFL. This included a franchise-record 15 receptions which he converted into 196 yards against Jacksonville in Week 4, and 14 receptions for 200 yards in Week 13 against Dallas. Wayne was also selected as a starter the Pro Bowl.

2011 season
Wayne's numbers were lower than usual in 2011 without Peyton Manning starting at quarterback, though he still led team in receptions (75) and receiving yards (960). He had four touchdown receptions as well. On September 25, 2011, Wayne recorded his 800th catch against the Pittsburgh Steelers.

2012 season
On March 13, 2012, the Colts re-signed Wayne to a three-year contract. Before the 2012 Week 5 matchup with the Green Bay Packers, the news of head coach Chuck Pagano's leukemia surfaced. Wayne's history with Pagano goes back to his college years, where Pagano was the Hurricanes' defensive backs coach, and Pagano's hiring as the Colts' head coach was a large factor in Wayne's decision to re-sign with Indianapolis. In response, Wayne caught 13 passes for a career-high 212 receiving yards and a game-winning touchdown from rookie quarterback Andrew Luck; Wayne earned the AFC Offensive Player of the Week award due to his performance, the first of his career. In Week 12 against Buffalo Bills, Wayne broke Cris Carter's record of consecutive games with 3 or more receptions with 59 games. He also passed former Washington Redskins receiver Art Monk for 12th on the NFL's all-time receptions list during the first half. During the wild-card game against the Baltimore Ravens, Wayne had 114 yards on nine receptions and moved into second in career playoff catches with 92 — only 59 behind leader Jerry Rice. However, the Colts lost the game 24-9.

Wayne was selected as the wide receiver for USA Football's 2012 All-Fundamentals Team, which honors 26 NFL players each year for executing the fundamentals of their position.

2013 season
In 2013, Wayne again posted 100 yards against Jacksonville in Week 4. In a Week 6 loss to San Diego, Wayne became the ninth player to reach 1,000 career receptions. However, a week later, Wayne tore his ACL; it was announced the next day that he would miss the remainder of the 2013 season. The injury also ended his consecutive games played streak at 189, the third-longest for a wide receiver in NFL history.

2014 season
With the retirement of Tony Gonzalez, 36-year-old Wayne entered 2014 as the active leader in career receiving yards. He gained 98 more in a season-opening loss to Denver, and 119 in Week 4 against Tennessee. In Week 8, Wayne became the ninth receiver in NFL history to record 14,000 receiving yards. He suffered an elbow injury in the game and missed the following week's matchup against the Pittsburgh Steelers. Near the conclusion of the Colts' 2014 season, it was announced that Wayne had played with a torn triceps since Week 6, which would require an offseason surgery to repair. He had just one reception in the Colts' three post-season games, concluding his career with franchise records for postseason receptions (93); receiving yards, yards-from-scrimmage, and all-purpose yards (1,254), receiving and total touchdowns (9), games with at least one touchdown (8), and games with 100+ yards receiving (3, shared with Dallas Clark and T. Y. Hilton).

On March 6, 2015, the Colts announced that they would not re-sign Wayne, which made him a free agent on March 10.

Retirement

On August 24, 2015, Wayne signed a one-year contract with the New England Patriots worth up to $3 million. On September 5, 2015, Wayne requested and was granted his release from the Patriots.

On January 15, 2016, after not playing the entire 2015 season, Wayne announced his retirement from professional football, saying, "It was fun, but it's time. It's just time. Whenever you can admit that you're done, you know you're done." He finished his NFL career tenth all-time in career receptions, tenth all-time in receiving yards and 24th in career touchdown receptions.

NFL career statistics

Regular season

Postseason

Post-playing career

On April 30, 2018, the Colts announced that Wayne would join the team as a volunteer receivers coach. On November 18, 2018, Wayne became the 15th player to be inducted into the team's Ring of Honor, in a ceremony attended by former teammates including Marvin Harrison, Manning and Saturday. On January 2, 2020, Wayne was named one of 15 modern-era finalists for election into the Pro Football Hall of Fame in Canton, Ohio. He and Pittsburgh Steelers safety Troy Polamalu are the only two finalists for 2020 to be nominated in their first year of eligibility. As of 2021, Wayne has been nominated twice for the Pro Football Hall of Fame, but has not yet been selected.

For the 2021 NFL Draft he joined Bleacher Report as a positional expert. He applauded the Giants first round pick of Kadarius Toney. Wayne went on to compare him to Percy Harvin and called him the toughest wide receiver in the draft.

Coaching career
On March 14, 2022, Wayne was hired as the wide receivers coach for the Colts.

Personal life
In 2012, a hotel valet stole his luxury vehicle from an Indianapolis hotel where Wayne left his car. The valet was arrested standing outside the car with a blood alcohol content of .13 percent.

References

External links

 Official website
Indianapolis Colts bio
 Miami Hurricanes bio

1978 births
Living people
10,000 receiving yards club
African-American coaches of American football
African-American players of American football
American Conference Pro Bowl players
American football wide receivers
Ed Block Courage Award recipients
Indianapolis Colts coaches
Indianapolis Colts players
John Ehret High School alumni
Miami Hurricanes football players
New England Patriots players
People from Jefferson Parish, Louisiana
People from Marrero, Louisiana
People from Southwest Ranches, Florida
Players of American football from Indianapolis
Players of American football from Miami
Players of American football from New Orleans